Bonny Cepeda (born Fernando Antonio Cruz Paz in the Dominican Republic) is a merengue artist, band leader and producer. In 1986 he was nominated for a Grammy Award for Top Tropical Latin Performance for his album, Noche de Discotheque.

Career 
In June 2021 Bonny declared in the Alofoke Radio Show that he received $60 000 to sing in a birthday party of the Venezuelan leader Nicolás Maduro. His comments generated criticism in social media and by members of the Venezuelan opposition due to the social and economic crisis that the country undergoes and because the celebration took place during the COVID-19 pandemic, when borders were restricted for most Venezuelans. Bonny afterwards denied having been paid.

Discography 
 Bonny Cepeda y la Gran Orquesta (1976)

 Donde Está Dios
 Llegó la Hora
 Mi Barrio
 No
 Canto a los Pueblos
 A René
 El Ven Tú
 Quiero Estar en el Fin

 La Gente Contenta (1977)

 Canto de la Montaña
 Dime la Verdad
 A Mi Pueblo
 Hay Que Luchar Hasta el Fin
 Enigma
 La Gente Contenta
 Mi Hijo 
 Sampabolla

 Esta Es Tu Tierra (1977)

 Contestación al Negrito del Batey
 Canto a la Montaña
 Don Augusto
 Enigma
 Esta Es Tu Tierra
 El Chofer
 La Gente Contenta
 La Bola
 El Hundío
 Canto a Mis Pueblos

 Bonny Con Kenton (1978)

 El Paso de las Lentejas
 Frente a Frente
 La Misma Flor
 Ansiedad
 El Perico
 Los Melones
 Santiago
 Ojos Que Habla
 Penumbras
 La Protesta de los Grandes

 El Maestro (1980)

 La Gran Manzana
 Cruce de Canales
 El Retrato de Mamá
 Como Está la Cosa
 Muchacho de Barrio
 Ay! San Antonio
 Para Mimi
 Homenaje a Javier Solís

 ¡Arrasando Con Todo! (1982), Reissued 1999

 Me Tiene Chivo
 Muchacha Curazoleña
 El Hijo de Madam Inés
 La Carta de Margot
 Yo Te Ví
 Hoy Rio Yo
 La Hija y la Mamá
 Ay! Doctor

 El Mandamás (1983)

 El Ñe Ñe Ñe
 Mundo Raro
 Las Novelas o Yo
 Campesina de Mi Tierra
 No Me Abandones Margot
 Bueno Que Me Pase
 Ya Soy Papá
 Jibarita Puertorriqueña
 El Mandamás
 Penas

 De Ahí, Ahí (1983)

 Obertura
 El Gufeo
 Márchate
 Donde Está la Plata
 Feel So Good
 Estoy Caliente
 Así Empezaron
 Un Tipo Como Yo
 Decídelo Tú

 El Invasor (1984), Reissued 2001

 El Perico
 Donde Quiera Esto Está Mal
 O Si o No
 Fin de Semana
 El Ladrón de Tu Amor
 El Jugador
 El Preso No. 40
 El Gago
 La Cosa Está Dura
 Lo Que Más Me Gusta de Ti

 Noche de Discotheque (1985)

 Mehui Mehui
 Tú Con Él
 Quisiera Ser
 Me Acostumbré
 Noche de Discotheque
 Ya Mismo Partiré
 Vuelve
 El Ladrón de Tu Amor

 Dance It! ¡Bailalo! (1986)

 Asesina
 Golpéame
 El Caminante
 Una Fotografía
 Dance
 Me Llamará
 Baila en la Patronal
 Sigan Bailando

 The Music Makers (1987)

 Lucy
 Club del Clan
 Veneno
 Entre la Espada y la Pared
 Cuarto de Hotel
 Dariana
 Donde Estás
 Yo Quiero Amarte

 A Nivel International (1988), Reissued 1992

 Bruja Hechicera
 Baby Say Yes
 Mira Mi Espejo
 Isla del Encanto
 Ven Recorre Mi Cuerpo
 Llegó el Amor
 Amante Mía
 La Chica de los Ojos Café

 Calor y Diferente (1989), Reissued 1992

 El Nene Quiere Un Sobito
 No Me Vuelvo a Enamorar
 Quisiera Ser
 Por el Amor de Una Mujer
 Déjame
 Infiel los Dos
 Soy Dominicano
 Don't Worry Be Happy

 Los 15 Éxitos de Bonny Cepeda (1989)

 Ay Doctor
 El Perico
 El Hijo de Madam Inés
 Me Tiene Chivo
 El Gufeo
 El Jugador
 Estoy Caliente
 El Mandamás
 No Me Abandones Margot
 El Preso
 El Ñe Ñe Ñe
 Feel So Good
 El Ladrón de Tu Amor
 La Carta de Margot
 Decídelo Tú

 Pa' la Calle (1990), Reissued 1992

 Pásame la Mano Morena
 Dame Valor Dios Mío
 Yo Soy el Jefe
 Pa' Comerte
 Fiesta de Graduación
 La Cosquillita
 Que Aprueben la ley
 No Se Puede Hacer Nada

 Que Canten los Niños (1991)

 De Quién es la Culpa
 Porque de Mi
 Isla del Encanto
 Pobre Pueblo
 Que Canten los Niños
 Fiesta de Graduación
 Dulce Colombiana
 Bimbo

 Dance Party (1991)

 El Riquito
 El Japonés
 Las Mujeres
 Toribio, el Inocente
 Me Casé Por Dinero
 Que Empeño
 Secretos
 El Pañuelito

 Blanco y Negro (1992)

 Salí a Papá y a Mamá  
 Traicionera  
 Todo Pasa 
 El Negro Ahí
 Pantera
 Dominican York
 Tu Papá y Yo
 Humo y Cerveza
 Matame
 Esta Noche Beberé

 Freedom (1992)

 Caribe
 Mi Vicio
 El Pelotero
 Despierta América
 Soy
 Amor Con Dolor
 Mentiras
 Maribel
 La Americana
 Te Prometo

 100% Aprobado (1993)

 Mi Medicina
 Guachimán de Tu Amor
 Tú No Te Vas
 Aquí Se Goza
 La India 
 Como Anillo al Dedo
 Ay Papi
 La Pastillita
 Mami Ven Pa'ca
 Mi Medicina (Versión Discoteca)

 12 Golden Hits (1993)

 Asesina
 Cuarto de Hotel
 El Riquito
 El Nene Quiere Un Sobito
 Yo Quiero Amarte
 El Japonés
 Una Fotografía
 Que Canten los Niños
 Yo Soy el Jefe
 Como Anillo al Dedo
 Pásame la Mano Morena
 Bruja Hechicera

 El Mandamás Original (1994)

 Como la Mía... Ninguna
 Algo le Di Yo
 Mi Doña
 Huele a Ti
 Mi Vecina
 Llegó el Calor
 Tu Marido... Te lo Implora
 Carnaval
 A Bailar Con el DJ
 Vieja No... Usada

 Serie Platino (1994)

 La Americana
 Salí a Papá y a Mamá
 Caribe
 Dominican York
 Matame
 Esta Noche Beberé
 Humo y Cerveza
 Pantera

 Best Seller (1995)

 Mangué de Amor
 Yo Bailo Así
 Atiéndela
 Ay Mami
 Las Mujeres Que Quieran Bailar
 Salomé
 Pena
 Como No Voy a Decirlo
 A los Hombres
 Seré Discreto
 Agua Con Sal
 Mosaico Cepeda Para DJ

 Arrollador (1996)

 Atiéndela
 Como Anillo al Dedo
 ¿Por Qué Me Hiciste Eso?
 Tu Marido... Te lo Implora
 Mi Medicina
 A Bailar Con Bonny
 A los Hombres
 Seré Discreto
 Mami Ven Pa'ca
 Carnaval

 El Heavy: Nueva Etapa (1996)

 La Quema
 El Heavy
 El Entierro (Versión Radio)
 Me Aumentaron
 Cuidado Con el Perro
 Quién Te Pintó la Camisa
 El Amor
 Rompamos el Contrato
 El Entierro (Versión Discoteca)
 Santo Domingo (Sueño o Realidad)

 Oro Merenguero: 20 Éxitos (1996)

Vol. 1 

 Salí a Papá y a Mamá
 Caribe
 El Pelotero
 Soy
 Esta Noche Beberé
 Amor Con Dolor
 Maribel
 Humo y Cerveza
 Todo Pasa
 Mentiras

Vol. 2 

 Dominican York
 Te Prometo
 Tu Papá y Yo
 Traicionera
 La Americana
 Pantera
 El Negro Ahí
 Matame
 Despierta América
 Mi Vicio 
 
 Come Back (1997)

 La Fiesta Está Buena
 El Baile del Culea
 La Nena de Mi Grado
 Agarraron al Compadre
 Eso Es Federal
 Como Decirte... Que
 Un Día Más Pa' la Semana
 Tengo Que Llorar
 No Puedo Arrancarte de Mi
 Viene el 2000

 La Nueva Ley (1998)

 No Hay Nadie Más    
 De Verdad Te lo Digo    
 Bajo la Nueva Ley    
 No Vuelvo Más Contigo    
 Pa' la Calle    
 Quieres Volver    
 Dime Como Te Olvido    
 La Cotorrita   
 Boleto de Ida

 Navidad Con Bonny (2000)

 Nos Asaltaron
 Navidad Con Bonny
 El Ulau
 Como Anillo al Dedo
 Mi Doña
 Fiesta de Carnaval
 Huele a Ti
 Tu Marido... Te lo Implora
 Mi Medicina (Versión Discoteca)
 Como la Mía... Ninguna
 Vieja No... Usada
 Guachimán de Tu Amor

 Legado (2000)

 Asesina
 Una Fotografía
 Ay Doctor
 Cuando Llega el Lunes
 Algo le Di Yo
 Que Canten los Niños
 Cuarto de Hotel
 La Domadora
 Aquí Se Goza
 Mami Ven Pa'ca
 Ay Papi
 El Hijo de Madam Inés

 Tú Tenías Razón (2002)

 Tú Tenías Razón
 Amarte Es Un Problema
 Ella Me Cuenta
 No Hagas Una Tormenta
 Al Que le Debo, Que Se Espere
 Déjame Vivir
 Volver a Amar
 El Doctor (2da Parte)
 Cuando Llega el Lunes
 ¿Cómo Te Olvido?
 Te Hice Mal

 Retro: Sus Éxitos (2004)

 Remix de Éxitos
 El Doctor
 Asesina
 Una Fotografía
 Cuarto de Hotel
 Que Canten los Niños
 Algo le Di Yo
 El Hijo de Madam Inés
 Te Gusta Tu Moreno
 El Doctor (Parte 2)
 Me Tiene Chivo
 Estoy Caliente
 Si el Vecino Se Queja (A Dúo Con TNT)
 Asesina (Reggaeton Con Zion y Lennox)
 Despierta Pueblo
 Bloopers de Grabación

 Sus Éxitos (2005)

 Remix de Éxitos
 Asesina
 Asesina (Reggaeton Con Zion y Lennox)
 Una Fotografía
 Que Canten los Niños
 Cuarto de Hotel
 Ay Doctor
 El Doctor (Parte 2)
 Vuelve
 El Pintalabio
 Que No Me Faltes Tú
 Cuando Llega el Lunes
 Aquí Se Goza

 De Nuevo Pa' la Calle (2007)

 Porque Te Hice el Amor 
 Me Gusta Como Baila 
 De 6 a 10 
 Te Gusta Tu Moreno 
 Necesito Espacio 
 Vuelve Vuelve 
 Vuelve Vuelve (Versión Bachata)
 El Doctor (Parte 2)
 El Pintalabios 
 La Mazucamba Majao 
 Despierta Pueblo 
 El Hijo de Madam Inés (Nueva Versión)
 Asesina (Versión Reggaeton)

 Años Dorados (2008)

 Me Tiene Chivo
 Ay! Doctor
 Lo Que Más Me Gusta de Ti
 Una Fotografía
 Asesina
 Cuarto de Hotel
 Golpéame
 Algo le Di Yo
 Noche de Discotheque
 El Perico
 Mehui Mehui
 El Mandamás
 El Ñe Ñe Ñe
 Yo Soy el Jefe
 Que Canten los Niños
 El Hijo de Madam Inés

References 

20th-century Dominican Republic male singers
21st-century Dominican Republic male singers
Dominican Republic people of Spanish descent
Merengue musicians
Living people
Dominican Republic expatriates in Puerto Rico
Year of birth missing (living people)